Vitaly Lazarenko (1890–1939) was a Russian/Soviet acrobat known best for his acrobatic skills and use of political satire during events.

He performed in the clown duo Bim Bom.

References 

1890 births
1939 deaths
Acrobats
Soviet clowns
Russian clowns